Cecil Arthur Grant Savidge   (20 May 1905 – 9 December 1975) was a British colonial administrator who was the second Chief Commissioner of Balochistan after the independence of Pakistan.

He was appointed a Member of the Order of the British Empire (MBE) in the 1941 New Year Honours.

References

British expatriates in Pakistan
1905 births
1975 deaths
Members of the Order of the British Empire
Indian Civil Service (British India) officers
Indian Political Service officers